Labranzagrande is a town and municipality in the Colombian Department of Boyacá, part of the subregion of the La Libertad Province.

Municipalities of Boyacá Department